State Route 236 (SR 236) is a state highway located in extreme southern Maine, entirely within York County. Between Kittery and South Berwick, SR 236 is known as the Harold L. Dow Highway. The highway runs roughly parallel to the New Hampshire border (the Salmon Falls River) over its entire length.

Route description
The southern terminus of SR 236 is at the intersection of SR 103 (Whipple Road), Woodlawn Avenue, and Shapleigh Road in Kittery, near the Portsmouth Naval Shipyard. It follows Shapleigh Road and Rogers Road to the Kittery Traffic Circle, where it connects to US 1, US 1 Bypass, and Old Post Road. The rotary marks the southern end of the Dow Highway. SR 236 has partial interchanges with US 1 Bypass and I-95, then continues northwest along the former right-of-way of the B&M Railroad until intersecting SR 4 in South Berwick at the northern end of the Dow Highway. To the west, SR 9 crosses the Salmon Falls River into Somersworth, New Hampshire and continues west as NH 9 / NH 236.

NH 236 (which terminates at the state border) is a westward extension of SR 236 through downtown Somersworth to NH 108 south of Rochester.  Though it does not directly connect to SR 236 as signed, the two routes are connected by SR 9.

History
The northern section of SR 236, from Gould's Corner (near SR 103 and SR 101) in Eliot to downtown Berwick, was originally designated in 1929 as part of SR 103.  That route was truncated to its current terminus in 1957, and its northern segment was re-designated as SR 236.  Both SR 103 and SR 236 have a terminus at the other route.  Most of the southern part of SR 236 between I-95 in Kittery and SR 91 in South Berwick was built in 1956 on the former right-of-way of the B&M Railroad after service was discontinued and the tracks removed four years earlier.  While railroad service has disappeared, SR 236 is a busy commuter corridor connecting to I-95, the Portsmouth Naval Shipyard, and downtown Portsmouth.

Junction list

References

236
Transportation in York County, Maine
Kittery, Maine
Eliot, Maine
South Berwick, Maine
Berwick, Maine